Schardenberg (Central Bavarian: Schadnberi) is a municipality in the district of Schärding in the Austrian state of Upper Austria.

In September 1938, the Passau Kreisleiter and Schärding Kreisleiter cordially welcomed Gauleiter August Eigruber in Schardenberg. During a rally at the Hermannseder Inn, Eigruber announced that the adjacent tower will be called Adolf-Hitler-Warte.

Geography
Schardenberg lies in the Innviertel. About 29 percent of the municipality is forest, and 61 percent is farmland.

References

Cities and towns in Schärding District